The Sebrell Rural Historic District is a national historic district located near Sebrell, Southampton County, Virginia.  The district encompasses 112 contributing buildings and 3 contributing site sites near the historically African-American village of Sebrell.  The buildings represent a variety of popular architectural styles including Georgian, Greek Revival, Queen Anne, and Italianate.  They include residential, agricultural, commercial, governmental, and institutional buildings dating from the 18th to mid-20th centuries.  Notable buildings include the Jesse Little Plantation House, W.B. Simmons Farm, Snowden, Quarter Farm (c. 1749), Unity Rowes General Store, Davis and Clark Store, Sebrell United Methodist Church (1910), and the St. Mary's AME Mount Zion Church (1910).

It was listed on the National Register of Historic Places in 2013.

References

African-American history of Virginia
Historic districts on the National Register of Historic Places in Virginia
Georgian architecture in Virginia
Greek Revival architecture in Virginia
Italianate architecture in Virginia
Queen Anne architecture in Virginia
Buildings and structures in Southampton County, Virginia
National Register of Historic Places in Southampton County, Virginia